ANAP may refer to:

National Association of Small Farmers (ANAP) in Cuba
The Motherland Party of Turkey (abbreviated as ANAVATAN and formerly abbreviated as ANAP)
Alliance Party for the Sake of Azerbaijan, a political party in Azerbaijan
Afghan National Auxiliary Police
American National Alternative Party (The newest American political party)